James Leon Wright (born March 3, 1955) is a former professional baseball pitcher. He played parts of two seasons in the major leagues for the Kansas City Royals, appearing in 17 games during the 1981 season and seven games during the 1982 season. He was the Colorado Rockies bullpen coach from 2009 to 2012. He also served as the team's pitching coach in 2002.

External links
, or Retrosheet, or Pura Pelota (Venezuelan Winter League)

1955 births
Living people
Auburn Phillies players
Baseball players from Missouri
Colorado Rockies (baseball) coaches
Kansas City Royals players
Major League Baseball pitchers
Midland Cubs players
Minor league baseball coaches
Missouri Western State University alumni
Navegantes del Magallanes players
American expatriate baseball players in Venezuela
Oklahoma City 89ers players
Omaha Royals players
Sportspeople from St. Joseph, Missouri
Pulaski Phillies players
Reading Phillies players
Spartanburg Phillies players